The Kuo Yuan Ye Museum of Cake and Pastry is a pastry culture and making museum in Taiwan.

The museum has two branches in Taiwan, one in Shilin District, Taipei and another in Yangmei District, Taoyuan City.

History
In 1708, ancestor of Kuo Yuan Ye moved from Zhangzhou to Taiwan within the Fujian Province of Qing Dynasty and started the family bakery business. To preserve the brand asset, the family opened a bakery museum at the 4th and 5th floor of the headquarters buildings in Yangmei District as Taiwan's first bakery museum in 2001. In 2002, the Shilin branch of the bakery museum was founded.

Transportation
The museum is accessible within walking distance north from Shilin Station of the Taipei Metro for the Shilin branch, and northwest from Puxin Station of the Taiwan Railways Administration for the Yangmei branch.

See also
 List of museums in Taiwan

References

External links
 

Museums established in 2001
2001 establishments in Taiwan
Food museums in Taiwan
Museums in Taipei
Museums in Taoyuan City
Baking